Sunneva keisarin kaupungissa (Finnish: Sunneva in the Emperor's City) is a historical novel by Finnish author Kaari Utrio.

Novels by Kaari Utrio
1970 novels
Tammi (company) books
20th-century Finnish novels
Finnish historical novels